The Marine Accident Investigation Branch (MAIB) is a UK government organisation, authorised to investigate all maritime accidents in UK waters and accidents involving UK registered ships worldwide. Investigations are limited to establishing cause, promoting awareness of risks and preventing recurrence. It may also participate in other maritime investigations where British citizens are involved or where the UK has a substantial interest.

History
The Marine Accident Investigation Branch (MAIB) was established in 1989 as a result of a recommendation of the public enquiry into the Herald of Free Enterprise disaster in 1987, when a ro-ro passenger ferry capsized off Zeebrugge, leading to the loss of 193 lives, many of them British citizens.

Responsibilities
The MAIB is an independent branch of the United Kingdom Department for Transport which can investigate any accident occurring in UK waters, regardless of the nationality of the vessel(s) involved, and accidents involving UK registered ships worldwide.

Empowered by the Merchant Shipping Act 1995, it is a government organisation headed by the Chief Inspector of Marine Accidents, currently Andrew Moll, who served in the Royal Navy prior to joining the MAIB. The MAIB is the marine equivalent of the much older Air Accidents Investigation Branch and the more recent Rail Accident Investigation Branch all of which report directly to the Secretary of State for Transport.

Investigations are thorough but are strictly limited to establishing cause, promoting awareness of risks and preventing recurrence. Reporting of accidents to the MAIB is mandatory for all commercially operated vessels in UK waters and for all UK registered vessels worldwide. The MAIB receives around 1,200 accident reports annually of which 25 to 30 become full investigations with published reports. The choice of which accidents are investigated is made on the basis of the scope of the safety lessons which may be learned as a result of the investigation however accidents meeting the definition of a 'very serious marine casualty' as defined in the regulations covering marine accident reporting and investigation in the UK must be investigated. The reports which are without prejudice, do not apportion blame and do not establish liability.

Location
Its current offices are located in Spring Place, Commercial Road, Southampton, Hampshire.

Beginning on 3 August 2009 the MAIB had been headquartered in the Mountbatten House in Southampton. Previously the MAIB was headquartered in the Carlton House in Southampton.

Publications
Accident reports provide a very detailed analysis of one specific accident and recommendations to parties involved. 
Safety Bulletins Set out immediate safety concerns which may be identified during an investigation. 
Annual Safety digests summarise the type of accidents and lessons which can be learnt. This is now classified by vessel type.
Safety flyers are issued if an investigation reveals an urgent general risk. 
Safety studies look at patterns of accidents to inform policy makers, including the International Maritime Organization, Maritime and Coastguard Agency and Health and Safety Executive, some of whom have overlapping responsibilities.   For example, the Review of lifeboats and launching systems' accidents revealed that 16% of fatalities investigated on merchant ships occurred during lifeboat training exercises.  Unfortunately not one life was saved by a ship's lifeboat, reported in the UK, in the same 10-year period.

See also

Other British accident investigation agencies
 Air Accidents Investigation Branch - Responsible for the investigation of air accidents in the United Kingdom
 Rail Accident Investigation Branch - Responsible for the investigation of rail accidents in the United Kingdom
 Road Safety Investigation Branch
Equivalent agencies in other countries
 Bureau d'Enquêtes sur les Événements de Mer - France
 Federal Bureau for Maritime Casualty Investigation - Germany
 National Transportation Safety Board - United States
 Canadian Transportation Accident Investigation and Safety Board - Canada

References

External links

1989 establishments in the United Kingdom
Department for Transport
Maritime incidents in the United Kingdom
Maritime safety organizations
Organisations based in Southampton
Public bodies and task forces of the United Kingdom government
Water transport in the United Kingdom